Rzaguliyev is an Azerbaijani surname. Notable people with the surname include:

Alakbar Rzaguliyev (1903–1974), Azerbaijani artist
Elbey Rzaguliyev (1926–2007), Azeribaijani Soviet artist and stage director

See also
 Rzagulu

Azerbaijani-language surnames